Brit Awards 2016  was held on 24 February 2016 and was the 36th edition of the British Phonographic Industry's annual pop music awards. The awards ceremony was held at The O2 Arena in London and were presented by Ant & Dec. Award nominations were revealed on 14 January 2016. British fashion designer Pam Hogg has designed the trophies for this year's ceremony, styling the BRIT statue.

The ceremony included a tribute to late British music icon David Bowie featuring an introduction by Annie Lennox, a tribute speech by Gary Oldman and a performance by Lorde backed by Bowie's long-time backing group.

Performances

The Brits Are Coming: Nominations Launch Party

Laura Whitmore hosted the launch at the ITV Studios in London on Thursday 14 January.

Main show Performances

Winners and nominees
The nominations were revealed on 14 January 2016.
{| class="wikitable" style="width:95%"
|- bgcolor="#bebebe"
! width="50%" | British Album of the Year(presented by Mark Ronson)
! width="50%" | British Producer of the Year
|-
| valign="top" |
 Adele – 25
 Coldplay – A Head Full of Dreams
 Florence and the Machine – How Big, How Blue, How Beautiful
 James Bay – Chaos and the Calm
 Jamie xx – In Colour
| valign="top" |
 Charlie Andrew
Mark Ronson
Mike Crossey
Tom Dalgety
|-
! width="50%" | British Single of the Year(presented by Suki Waterhouse and Simon Le Bon)
! width="50%" | British Video of the Year(presented by Alan Carr and Lianne La Havas)
|-
| valign="top" |
 Adele – "Hello"
 Calvin Harris & Disciples – "How Deep Is Your Love"
 Ed Sheeran & Rudimental - "Bloodstream"
 Ellie Goulding – "Love Me like You Do"
 James Bay – "Hold Back the River"
 Jess Glynne – "Hold My Hand"
 Little Mix – "Black Magic"
 Olly Murs featuring  Demi Lovato – "Up"
 Philip George – "Wish You Were Mine"
 Years & Years – "King"
| valign="top" |
 One Direction – "Drag Me Down" 1
 <small>Adele – "Hello"</small>
 Ed Sheeran – "Photograph"
 Jessie J – "Flashlight"
 Little Mix – "Black Magic"EliminatedCalvin Harris & Disciples – "How Deep Is Your Love"
Ellie Goulding – "Love Me like You Do"
Naughty Boy featuring Beyoncé & Arrow Benjamin – "Runnin' (Lose It All)"
Sam Smith – "Writing's on the Wall"
Years & Years – "King"
|-
! width="50%" | British Male Solo Artist(presented by Kylie Minogue)
! width="50%" | British Female Solo Artist(presented by Louis Tomlinson and Liam Payne)
|-
| valign="top" |
 James Bay Aphex Twin
 Calvin Harris
 Jamie xx
 Mark Ronson
| valign="top" |
 Adele Amy Winehouse
 Florence and the Machine
 Jess Glynne
 Laura Marling
|-
! width="50%" | British Group(presented by Simon Pegg)
! width="50%" | British Breakthrough Act(presented by Nick Grimshaw and Cheryl)
|-
| valign="top" |
 Coldplay Blur
 Foals
 One Direction
 Years & Years
| valign="top" |
 Catfish and the Bottlemen James Bay
 Jess Glynne
 Wolf Alice
 Years & Years
|-
! width="50%" | International Male Solo Artist(presented by Major Lazer)
! width="50%" | International Female Solo Artist(presented by Fleur East and Craig David)
|-
| valign="top" |
 Justin Bieber Drake
 Father John Misty
 Kendrick Lamar
 The Weeknd
| valign="top" |
 Björk Ariana Grande
 Courtney Barnett
 Lana Del Rey
 Meghan Trainor
|-
! width="50%" | International Group(presented by Jourdan Dunn and Henry Cavill)
! width="50%" | Critics' Choice Award
|-
| valign="top" |
 Tame Impala Alabama Shakes
 Eagles of Death Metal
 Major Lazer
 U2
| valign="top" |
 Jack Garratt Frances
 Izzy Bizu
|-
! width="50%" | Global Success Award(presented by Tim Peake)
! width="50%" | Icon Award(presented by Annie Lennox)
|-
| valign="top" |
 Adele| valign="top" |
 David Bowie (collected by Gary Oldman)
|}

1 Liam Payne and  Louis Tomlinson accept this award for British Video of the Year.

Multiple nominations and awards

Brit Awards 2016 album

The Brit Awards 2016''' is a compilation and box set which includes the "62 biggest tracks from the past year". The box set has three discs with a total of sixty-two songs by various artists.

Track listing

CD 1

CD 2

CD 3

Weekly charts

References

External links
Brit Awards 2016 at Brits.co.uk

Brit Awards
Brit
BRIT awards
Brit
Brit Awards